Edmon Shehadeh  was a Palestinian poet and literary.

Life
Edmon Shehadeh was born in Haifa on 3 February 1933. He was the fifth child among 3 brothers and 6 sisters. In 1936 he moved with his family to Nazareth where he completed his life.

He awarded the first prize for theater production in Haifa on 1977, Arabic literature full-time award on 1989 and Shield House of Arab culture for national poets on 1992.

Death
Edmon Shehadeh died on 17 December 2017 at the age of 84.

References

1933 births
2017 deaths
Palestinian poets
People from Haifa